L. vulgare may refer to:
 Leucanthemum vulgare, the oxeye daisy, a widespread flowering plant species
 Ligustrum vulgare, the wild privet, a plant species

See also
 Vulgare